Gretel Ehrlich is an American travel writer, poet and essayist.

Biography 
Born in 1946 in Santa Barbara, California, she studied at Bennington College and UCLA film school. She began to write full-time in 1978 while living on a Wyoming ranch after the death of a loved one. Ehrlich debuted in 1985 with The Solace of Open Spaces, a collection of essays on rural life in Wyoming. Her first novel was also set in Wyoming, entitled Heart Mountain (1988), about a community being invaded by an internment camp for Japanese Americans.

One of Ehrlich's best-received books is a volume of creative nonfiction essays called Islands, The Universe, Home. Her characteristic style of merging intense, vivid, factual observations of nature with a wryly mystical personal voice is evident in this work. Other books include This Cold Heaven: Seven Seasons in Greenland and two volumes of poetry.

In 1991 Ehrlich was hit by lightning and was incapacitated for several years. She wrote a book about the experience, A Match to the Heart, which was published in 1994. Since 1993, she has traveled extensively, especially through Greenland and western China.

Her work is frequently anthologised, including The Nature Reader. She has also received many grants. In 1991, she collaborated with British choreographer Siobhan Davies, writing and recording a poem cycle for a ballet that opened in the Southbank Centre in London.

Selected bibliography 
To Touch the Water, Ahsahta Press, 1981, 
The Solace of Open Spaces, Viking Press, 1985, 
Heart Mountain, Viking Press, 1988, 
Drinking Dry Clouds: Stories from Wyoming, Capra Press, 1991, 
Islands, the Universe, Home, Viking Press, 1991, 
Arctic Heart: A Poem Cycle, Capra Press, 1992, 
A Match to the Heart: One Woman's Story of Being Struck by Lightning, Pantheon Books, 1994, 
John Muir: Nature's Visionary, National Geographic Society, 2000, 
This Cold Heaven: Seven Seasons in Greenland, Pantheon Books, 2001, 
The Future of Ice: A Journey Into Cold, Pantheon Books, 2004, 
In the Empire of Ice: Encounters in a Changing Landscape, National Geographic Society, 2010, 
Facing the Wave: A Journey in the Wake of the Tsunami, Pantheon, 2013, 
”Unsolaced: Among the Way to All That Is”, Pantheon, 2021

References

External links 
 Author papers (1923–2005) at Southwest Collection/Special Collections Library, Texas Tech University
 Author papers (1960-2018) at Southwest Collection/Special Collections Library, Texas Tech University
 Powell's Books interview with Gretel Ehrlich
 Whiting Foundation Profile

American essayists
American memoirists
American nature writers
Living people
Writers from Santa Barbara, California
Poets from Wyoming
1946 births
Poets from California
American women poets
American women memoirists
American women essayists
Women science writers
21st-century American women